The Protopriest of the College of Cardinals (and, rare) in the College of Cardinals, is the first Cardinal-Priest in the order of precedence, hence directly after the Cardinal-bishops.
 
This title is always attached to the most senior Cardinal Priest according to date of his creation. From the 17th century until the end of the 19th century, the Protopriest was usually assigned to the Titular church  of San Lorenzo in Lucina. The last protoprete who opted for that title was Mieczysław Halka Ledóchowski in 1896.
 
The protopriest has the honor of pronouncing the formal prayer for the new pope at the papal inauguration after the protodeacon (most senior Cardinal deacon) bestows the pallium and before the Dean of the College of Cardinals (most senior Cardinal-bishop) presents the Ring of the Fisherman. This last happened at the inauguration of Pope Benedict XVI in 2005, but did not happen at the inauguration of Pope Francis in 2013 because the protopriest, Cardinal Paulo Evaristo Arns, then 91 years old, remained in São Paulo, Brazil, and did not attend. 

Cardinal Michael Michai Kitbunchu of Bangkok has been the protopriest since 14 December 2016.

Protopriests since 1920 
 James Gibbons (1920–1921)
 Michael Logue (1921–1924)
 Giuseppe Francica-Nava de Bontifè (1924–1928)
 Lev Skrbenský z Hřiště (1928–1938)
 William Henry O'Connell (1938–1944)
 Alessio Ascalesi, 1944–May 1952
 Michael von Faulhaber, June 1952
 Alessandro Verde, 1957–1958
 Jozef-Ernest van Roey, 1958–1961
 Manuel Gonçalves Cerejeira, 1961–1977
 Carlos Vasconcellos Motta, 1977–1982
 Giuseppe Siri, 1982–1989
 Paul-Émile Léger, 1989–1991
 Franz König, 1991–2004
 Stephen Kim, 2004–2009
 Eugênio Sales, 2009–2012
 Paulo Evaristo Arns, 2012–2016
 Michael Michai Kitbunchu, 2016–

See also 
 Cardinal Dean
 Cardinal Protodeacon

Notes

References 

20

ro:Protopop